Rumarz-e Sofla (also Romanized as Rūmarz-e Soflá; also known as Rūmaz-e Soflá and Rūmorz-e Pā’īn) is a village in Eslamabad Rural District, in the Central District of Jiroft County, Kerman Province, Iran. At the 2006 census, its population was 234, in 47 families.

References 

Populated places in Jiroft County